James Gunn (born 1966) is an American filmmaker.

James Gunn may also refer to:

James E. Gunn (1923–2020) American science fiction scholar and writer
James Andrew Gunn, British medical doctor, founder of the British Pharmacological Society
James Gunn (astronomer) (born 1938), American astronomer
James Gunn (explorer) of Scotland, member of Henry Sinclair's survey expedition
James Gunn (congressman) (1843–1911), American congressman from Idaho
James Gunn (senator) (1753–1801), United States senator from Georgia
SS James Gunn, a Liberty ship 
James Gunn (Australian politician), Tasmanian politician from the electoral district of Sorell (1872–1882)
James Gunn (screenwriter, born 1920) (1920–1966), American film and television screenwriter

See also
Herbert James Gunn (1893–1964), Scottish landscape and portrait painter